"The One" is a song by American boy band Backstreet Boys. It was released on May 1, 2000, as the fourth and final single from their third studio album, Millennium (1999). It reached the top 10 in Canada, Hungary, Portugal, Romania, Spain, and the United Kingdom, and it peaked at number 30 on the US Billboard Hot 100. The song was used as the opening theme for the anime series Hanada Shōnen Shi.

Background
A sneak preview of the song was released on the Selections from A Night Out with the Backstreet Boys CD on November 17, 1998, and had a slightly different sound to it, while another preview was shown at the end of Britney Spears' album ...Baby One More Time (under the title "I'll Be the One") two months later.

In a 2001 interview on The View, the group stated they never really intended "The One" as their fourth single. The group held a poll on TRL allowing fans to choose the next single from their album, and after Nick Carter himself called in and voted for "The One", his large fan-base followed. The rest of the group had preferred the song "Don't Want You Back", which had been leading in votes up to that point.

Music video

Background
The music video was directed by Chris Hafner and Kevin Richardson in April 2000. Most of the video is in widescreen format, though the within letterboxed black area are pulses of color based on the brightness of the shots. The choruses mainly feature two different clips side-by-side, further letterboxing the video. During the breakdown before the final choruses, the normal letterboxed image is split horizontally into four segments and different clips flash between them with camera flash effects on the borderlines.

Synopsis
The video opened with a dedication to the Boys' fans, crew, band, and dancers. The video itself opens with a time-lapse shot of Gainbridge Fieldhouse (then named Conseco Fieldhouse), home of the Indiana Pacers, being converted from a basketball court to the band's stage for the Into the Millennium Tour, which is reversed at the end of the video. The remainder of the video is made up of clips of performance footage from the tour, and less notably, a number of panned still images and off-stage clips from behind the scenes, or from other promotional appearances done for Millennium.

The footage is not specifically related to "The One", though there are a few clips of the band synced to the lyrics. A soundtrack of screaming fans was added to the album version of the song to give a live feeling to the song. Concert footage was from the entire tour, including a concert in the Bryce Jordan Center, and the basketball arena at Penn State University. There also appears in the video at segment of the Backstreet Boys playing basketball in Michigan State jerseys. This is because concert footage was also taken from when the band played the Jack Breslin Center.

Track listings

UK CD single
 "The One" (album version) – 3:46
 "Show Me the Meaning of Being Lonely" (Soul Solution Mixshow edit) – 3:40
 "Larger than Life" (Jack D. Elliot radio mix) – 3:50
 "The One" (video)

UK cassette single and European CD single
 "The One" (album version) – 3:46
 "The One" (instrumental) – 3:46

European 7-inch single
A. "The One" (album version) – 3:46
B. "Larger than Life" (Jack D. Elliot radio mix) – 3:50

European and Australian maxi-CD single
 "The One" (album version) – 3:46
 "The One" (instrumental) – 3:46
 "Show Me the Meaning of Being Lonely" (Soul Solution Mixshow edit) – 3:40
 "Larger than Life" (Jack D. Elliot radio mix) – 3:50

Japanese CD single
 "The One" (album version) – 3:46
 "The One" (instrumental) – 3:46
 "Show Me the Meaning of Being Lonely" (Soul Solution Mixshow edit) – 3:40
 "Show Me the Meaning of Being Lonely" (Jason Nevins crossover remix) – 3:55
 "Larger than Life" (Jack D. Elliot radio mix) – 3:50

Charts

Weekly charts

Year-end charts

Release history

References

1999 songs
2000 singles
Backstreet Boys songs
Jive Records singles
Song recordings produced by Max Martin
Songs written by Brian Littrell
Songs written by Max Martin